The Walsall–Wolverhampton line is a railway line in the West Midlands, England.  It connects the town of Walsall to the city of Wolverhampton. The complete line does not currently have any regular scheduled passenger services: The line's local passenger service was withdrawn in 1965, it was restored in 1998, only to be withdrawn again in 2008. At present, the main use of the line is by freight trains, and it is also used as a diversionary route when engineering works are carried out on the West Coast Main Line.

In 2017, the West Midlands Combined Authority announced that they would restore services to the line over the following decade, with new stations at Willenhall and James Bridge.

History

Early history
Most of the present route was opened in 1837 as part of the original Grand Junction Railway (GJR), one of the first railway trunk routes. Built as a long-distance trunk route, the original GJR line did not directly serve either Walsall or Wolverhampton, instead running around the outskirts of both of them. A station on the original line called Wolverhampton was opened at the edge of the town centre, this was later renamed  in 1855 after the centrally located Wolverhampton (High level) station on the Stour Valley Line was opened, Wednesfield Heath was then closed in 1873.

The GJR amalgamated with other railways to form the London and North Western Railway (LNWR) in 1846. The present line was completed in 1881, when the LNWR constructed two spurs from the GJR at Wolverhampton and Walsall. The Wolverhampton spur diverged south from the original line and linked to Wolverhampton (High Level) station. The spur at the Walsall end diverged north from the GJR and linked to the South Staffordshire Line at Pleck Junction, where it gave access to Walsall station. A station was opened on the Walsall spur called , this later closed in 1958.

The line later came under the control of the London, Midland and Scottish Railway and later British Rail in 1948.

The line's strategic use as a freight and diversionary route led to it being electrified with overhead wires in the 1960s, as an offshoot of the West Coast Main Line electrification, along with the connecting Walsall Line.

Recent history

A passenger service was reintroduced 1998, however this was not a success and was withdrawn again in 2008. The service, which was funded by Centro and operated by Central Trains (later London Midland), operated hourly, and was reintroduced to the line on 24 May 1998. However, in 2005 the Strategic Rail Authority proposed the withdrawal of the service, citing low passenger numbers and a lack of rolling stock. Centro opposed this, arguing that the bus service between Walsall and Wolverhampton was a poor replacement, as it took 40 minutes compared to 15 minutes by train, and the service was given a temporary reprieve. During the early-mid 2000s, the line was used as part of an hourly service between Walsall and Wellington. But these services were withdrawn in 2006 and the service was reduced to an hourly service between Walsall and Wolverhampton, with only one or two trains per day in each direction extending to Wellington in the early morning and late at night.

It was announced in July 2008 that the government was withdrawing funding for this service, and as a result the local service was mainly withdrawn as of December 2008. However the line remains open for freight trains, and the section between Wolverhampton and Darlaston Junction continues to be used by certain trains between Birmingham and Wolverhampton, and will also be used as a diversionary route when the West Coast Main Line is closed for engineering works. Between 2008 and 2011 this section was also used by the now defunct Wrexham & Shropshire passenger services to London.

The full service was withdrawn on 13 December 2008, although there was still a 'Parliamentary train' – initially, one train per day ran directly from Walsall to Wolverhampton on weekdays, leaving Walsall at 19:36, but this was replaced in the 19 May 2013 timetable by a Saturdays-only train from Wolverhampton to Walsall leaving Wolverhampton at 05:42 (in the December 2019 timetable).

A service calling at all stations via Birmingham New street now operates, taking over 1 hour, compared with 15 minutes for the direct service, and London Midland advise passengers to use the National Express West Midlands 529 bus instead.

Future plans
The West Midlands Combined Authority have announced their intention to restore a passenger service to the line, along with new stations at Willenhall and Darlaston James Bridge.

In August 2018, the West Midlands Combined Authority had secured land for the proposed Darlaston.
 
This line has been identified by Campaign for a Better Transport as a priority 1 candidate for reopening.

Planning applications for the two stations were formally submitted in March 2020.

From the timetable change on Sunday 15th May 2022, London Northwestern Railway services between Crewe and Birmingham New Street via Stoke-on-Trent, began running on the line again, in preparation for the opening of new stations at Darlaston and Willenhall.

References

External links 
 Walsall Transport strategy
 London Midland website
 BBC Black Country: Have your say on the rail line closure

Rail transport in Wolverhampton
Rail transport in Walsall
Railway lines in the West Midlands (region)